The 15th National Assembly of Vietnam is a parliamentary cycle that commenced in July 2021 following the legislative elections on 23 May 2021. The National Assembly has 499 members, formally confirmed at the 8th meeting of the National Election Council on 12 July 2021.

The 15th National Assembly first convened on 20 July 2021 to re-elect Vương Đình Huệ as its Chairman, Nguyễn Xuân Phúc as President of Vietnam and Phạm Minh Chính as Prime Minister of Vietnam.

Election 
Legislative elections were held on 23 May 2021 to elect members of the National Assembly and deputies of provincial, district and communical councils. About 69,243,604 people went to vote in 63 provinces and municipalities throughout the country. There were 868 candidates contested in 184 multi-member constituencies nationwide, with a maximum of 500 candidates elected.

On 10 June 2021, the National Election Council refused to affirm the membership of Trần Văn Nam, CPV Secretary of Bình Dương Province following investigations in his corruption. His seat in Bình Dương Province was removed.

At the end 499 candidates were announced elected. The Communist party won 485 seats with the rest going to independent candidates.

Leadership 

 Chairman: Vương Đình Huệ
 First Deputy Chairman: Trần Thanh Mẫn
 Deputy Chairmen: Nguyễn Khắc Định, Nguyễn Đức Hải, Trần Quang Phương
 Secretary: Bùi Văn Cường

Composition

Sessions 
Although scheduled to take place between 20 July and 5 August 2021, the first meeting session was shortened due to severe COVID-19 outbreaks in the country.

During the nine days of meetings, the lawmakers elected leaders of the National Assembly, State and Government leaders, the Chief Justice and Prosecutore General and heads of National Assembly committees.

It also ratified 29 resolutions, including 17 resolutions on organisation and personnel, 11 thematic resolutions, and one general resolution on the first session.

The first session wrapped up on 28 July with calls to the state and governments of all levels for COVID-19 prevention.

Results 

 Election of National Assembly leaders

 Election of State leaders
The elections of the State President, Vice Presidents, the Chief Justice and the Prosecutor General took place on 26 July 2021.

 Election of Government leaders

References 

National Assembly (Vietnam)